The 1977–78 New Jersey Nets season was the Nets' 11th in franchise history, their second in the NBA, and their first in New Jersey, following their relocation from nearby Long Island.

Draft picks

Roster

Regular season

Season standings

z – clinched division title
y – clinched division title
x – clinched playoff spot

Record vs. opponents

Awards and records
Bernard King, NBA All-Rookie First Team 1st Team

References

New Jersey Nets season
New Jersey Nets seasons
New Jersey Nets
New Jersey Nets
Piscataway, New Jersey